Cumin ( or , or ) (Cuminum cyminum) is a flowering plant in the family Apiaceae, native to the Irano-Turanian Region. Its seeds – each one contained within a fruit, which is dried – are used in the cuisines of many cultures in both whole and ground form. Although cumin is used in traditional medicine, there is no high-quality evidence that it is safe or effective as a therapeutic agent.

Etymology 
The term comes via Middle English and Old French from the Latin term cuminum. This in turn comes from the Ancient Greek  (kúminon), a Semitic borrowing related to Hebrew  (kammōn) and Arabic  (kammun). All of these ultimately derive from Akkadian  (kamūnu).

Description 

Cumin is the dried seed of the herb Cuminum cyminum, a member of the parsley family. Each branch has two to three sub-branches. All the branches attain the same height, so the plant has a uniform canopy. The stem is colored grey or dark green. The flowers are small, white or pink, and borne in umbels. Each umbel has five to seven umbellets. The fruit is a lateral fusiform or ovoid achene 4–5 mm (– in) long, containing two mericarps with a single seed. Cumin seeds have eight ridges with oil canals. They resemble caraway seeds, being oblong in shape, longitudinally ridged, and yellow-brown in color, like other members of the family Apiaceae (Umbelliferae) such as caraway, parsley, and dill.

Confusion with other spices 

Cumin is sometimes confused with caraway (Carum carvi), another spice in the parsley family (Apiaceae). Many European languages do not distinguish clearly between the two. Many Slavic and Uralic languages refer to cumin as "Roman caraway" or "spice caraway". The distantly related Bunium persicum and Bunium bulbocastanum and the unrelated Nigella sativa are both sometimes called black cumin (q.v.).

History 

Likely originating in Central Asia, Southwestern Asia, or the Eastern Mediterranean, cumin has been in use as a spice for thousands of years. Seeds of wild cumin were excavated in the now-submerged settlement of Atlit-Yam, dated to the early 6th millennium BC. Seeds excavated in Syria were dated to the second millennium BC. They have also been reported from several New Kingdom levels of ancient Egyptian archaeological sites. In the ancient Egyptian civilization, cumin was used as a spice and as a preservative in mummification.

Cumin was a significant spice for the Minoans in ancient Crete. Ideograms for cumin appear in Linear A archive tablets documenting Minoan palace stores during the Late Minoan period. The ancient Greeks kept cumin at the dining table in its own container (much as pepper is frequently kept today), and this practice continues in Morocco. Cumin was also used heavily in ancient Roman cuisine. In India, it has been used for millennia as a traditional ingredient in innumerable recipes, and forms the basis of many other spice blends.

Cumin was introduced to the Americas by Spanish and Portuguese colonists. Black and green cumin are used in Persian cuisine. Today, the plant is mostly grown in the Indian subcontinent, Northern Africa, Mexico, Chile, and China. Since cumin is often used as part of bird food and exported to many countries, the plant can occur as an introduced species in many territories.

Cultivation and production

Cultivation areas 
India is the world's largest producer of cumin, accounting for about 70%. The other major cumin-producing countries are Syria (13%), Turkey (5%), UAE (3%), and Iran. India produced 856,000 tons of cumin seed in 2020–2021 fiscal year.

Climatic requirements 
Cumin is a drought-tolerant tropical or subtropical crop. It is vulnerable to frost and has a growth season of 120 frost-free days. The Mediterranean climate is most suitable for its growth. Cultivation of cumin requires a long, hot summer of three to four months. At low temperatures, leaf color changes from green to purple. High temperature might reduce growth period and induce early ripening. In India, cumin is sown from October until the beginning of December, and harvesting starts in February. In Syria and Iran, cumin is sown from mid-November until mid-December (extensions up to mid-January are possible) and harvested in June/July.

Grading

The three noteworthy sorts of cumin seed in the market vary in seed shading, amount of oil, and flavor.
 Iranian
 Indian, South Asian
 Middle Eastern

Cultivation parameters 
Cumin is grown from seeds. Cumin is vulnerable to frost damage, especially at flowering and early seed formation stages. Methods to reduce frost damage are spraying with sulfuric acid (0.1%), irrigating the crop prior to frost incidence, setting up windbreaks, or creating an early-morning smoke cover. The seedlings of cumin are rather small and their vigor is low. Soaking the seeds for 8 hours before sowing enhances germination. Fertile, sandy, loamy soils with good aeration, proper drainage, and high oxygen availability are preferred. The pH optimum of the soil ranges from 6.8 to 8.3. Cumin seedlings are sensitive to salinity and emergence from heavy soils is rather difficult. Therefore, a proper seedbed preparation (smooth bed) is crucial for optimal establishment of cumin.

Two sowing methods are used for cumin, broadcasting and line sowing. For broadcast sowing, the field is divided into beds and the seeds are uniformly broadcast in this bed. Afterwards, they are covered with soil using a rake. The seeds are then placed in these furrows and covered with soil. Line sowing offers advantages for intercultural operations such as weeding, hoeing, or spraying. The recommended sowing depth is 1–2 cm and the recommended sowing density is around 120 plants per m2. The water requirements of cumin are lower than those of many other species. Despite this, cumin is often irrigated after sowing to be sure that enough moisture is available for seedling development. The amount and frequency of irrigation depends on the climate conditions.

Cultivation management 
The relative humidity in the center of origin of cumin is rather low. High relative humidity (i.e. wet years) favors fungal diseases. Cumin is especially sensitive to Alternaria blight and Fusarium wilt. Early-sown crops exhibit stronger disease effects than late sown crops. The most important disease is Fusarium wilt, resulting in yield losses up to 80%. Fusarium is seed- or soil-borne and it requires distinct soil temperatures for development of epidemics. Inadequate fertilization might favor Fusarium epidemics. Cumin blight (Alternaria) appears in the form of dark brown spots on leaves and stems. When the weather is cloudy after flowering, the incidence of the disease is increased. Another, but less important, disease is powdery mildew. Incidence of powdery mildew in early development can cause drastic yield losses because no seeds are formed. Later in development, powdery mildew causes discolored, small seeds.

Pathogens can lead to high reductions in crop yield. Cumin can be attacked by aphids (Myzus persicae) at the flowering stage. They suck the sap of the plant from tender parts and flowers. The plant becomes yellow, the seed formation is reduced (yield reduction), and the quality of the harvested product decreases. Heavily infested plant parts should be removed. Other important pests are the mites (Petrobia latens) which frequently attack the crop. Since the mites mostly feed on young leaves, the infestation is more severe on young inflorescences.

The open canopy of cumin is another problem. Only a low proportion of the incoming light is absorbed. The leaf area index of cumin is low (about 1.5). This might be a problem because weeds can compete with cumin for essential resources such as water and light and thereby lower yield. The slow growth and a short stature of cumin favors weed competition additionally. Two hoeing and weeding sessions (30 and 60 days after sowing) are needed for the control of weeds. During the first weeding session (30 days after sowing), thinning should be done, as well, to remove excess plants. The use of preplant or pre-emergence herbicides is very effective in India, but this kind of herbicide application requires soil moisture for a successful weed control.

Breeding 
Cumin is a diploid species with 14 chromosomes (i.e. 2n = 14). The chromosomes of the different varieties have morphological similarities with no distinct variation in length and volume. Most of the varieties available today are selections. The variabilities of yield and yield components are high. Varieties are developed by sib mating in enclosed chambers or by biotechnology. Cumin is a cross-pollinator, i.e. the breeds are already hybrids. Therefore, methods used for breeding are in vitro regenerations, DNA technologies, and gene transfers. The in vitro cultivation of cumin allows the production of genetically identical plants. The main sources for the explants used in vitro regenerations are embryos, hypocotyl, shoot internodes, leaves, and cotyledons. One goal of cumin breeding is to improve its resistance to biotic (fungal diseases) and abiotic (cold, drought, salinity) stresses. The potential genetic variability for conventional breeding of cumin is limited and research about cumin genetics is scarce.

Uses 
Cumin seed is used as a spice for its distinctive flavor and aroma. Cumin can be found in some cheeses, such as Leyden cheese, and in some traditional breads from France. Cumin can be an ingredient in chili powder (often Tex-Mex or Mexican-style) and is found in achiote blends, adobos, sofrito, garam masala, curry powder, and bahaarat, and is used to flavor numerous commercial food products. In South Asian cooking it is often combined with coriander seeds in a powdered mixture called dhana jeera.

Cumin can be used ground or as whole seeds. It imparts an earthy, warming and aromatic character to food, making it a staple in certain stews and soups, as well as spiced gravies such as curry and chili. It is also used as an ingredient in some pickles and pastries.

Traditional 
In India, the seeds are powdered and used in different forms such as kashaya (decoction), arishta (fermented decoction), and vati (tablet/pills), and processed with ghee (a semifluid clarified butter). In traditional medicine practices of several countries, dried cumin seeds are believed to have medicinal purposes, although there is no scientific evidence for any use as a drug or medicine.

Volatiles and essential oil 
Cuminaldehyde, cymene, and terpenoids are the major volatile components of cumin oil which is used for a variety of flavors, perfumes, and essential oil. Cumin oil may be used as an ingredient in some cosmetics.

Aroma 
Cumin's flavor and warm aroma are due to its essential oil content, primarily the aroma compound, cuminaldehyde. Other aroma compounds of toasted cumin are the substituted pyrazines, 2-ethoxy-3-isopropylpyrazine, 2-methoxy-3-sec-butylpyrazine, and 2-methoxy-3-methylpyrazine. Other components include γ-terpinene, safranal, p-cymene, and β-pinene.

Nutritional value 
In a 100-g reference amount, cumin seeds provide high amounts of the Daily Value for fat (especially monounsaturated fat), protein, and dietary fiber (table). B vitamins, vitamin E, and several dietary minerals, especially iron, magnesium, and manganese, are present in substantial Daily Value amounts (table). Cumin seeds contain petroselinic acid.

References

External links 
 
 

Edible Apiaceae
Medicinal plants of Asia
Plants described in 1753
Spices